Charles Johnston Robertson (2 January 1873 – 7 March 1940) was an Australian rules footballer who played with South Melbourne in the Victorian Football League (VFL).

Notes

External links 

1873 births
1940 deaths
Australian rules footballers from Melbourne
Sydney Swans players
Port Melbourne Football Club players
People from South Melbourne